The 1949–50 La Liga was the 19th season since its establishment. Atlético de Madrid conquered their third title.

Format
Due to the expansion of the league to 16 teams for the next season, the two last qualified teams played the relegation playoffs against the third and fourth qualified teams of the promotion play-offs from Segunda División.

Team locations

Málaga made their debut in La Liga.

League table

Results

Relegation play-offs
Gimnástico played their match at Sarrià Stadium and Oviedo at Estadio Metropolitano de Madrid.

|}

Top scorers

External links
Official LFP Site 

1949 1950
1949–50 in Spanish football leagues
Spain